Susan Hay-Carr (born 15 September 1964) is a British sailor. She competed at the 1988 Summer Olympics, the 1992 Summer Olympics, and the 1996 Summer Olympics.

References

External links
 
 

1964 births
Living people
British female sailors (sport)
Olympic sailors of Great Britain
Sailors at the 1988 Summer Olympics – 470
Sailors at the 1992 Summer Olympics – 470
Sailors at the 1996 Summer Olympics – 470
People from Billericay